Jean-François Stévenin (23 April 194427 July 2021) was a French actor and filmmaker. He appeared in 150 films and television shows since 1968. He starred in the film Cold Moon, which was entered into the 1991 Cannes Film Festival.

Filmography

 La Chamade (1968) as Le jeune homme au pull bleu dans le bistrot (uncredited)
 The Wild Child (1970) as Countryman
 Out 1 (1971) as Marlon
 Such a Gorgeous Kid Like Me (1972) as Le vendeur de journaux (uncredited)
 Day for Night (1973) as Jean-François, l'assistant réalisateur
 Si j'te cherche... j'me trouve (1974) as Jean-François
 Zig-Zag (1975) as Un client de Marie & Pauline (uncredited)
 Small Change (1976) as Jean-François Richet, the Schoolteacher
 Barocco (1976) as Jeune homme brun
 The Old Country Where Rimbaud Died (1977) as Le chauffeur de taxi / Le peintre / Le marchand de tableaux
 La Machine (1977) as L'évêque
 La Tortue sur le dos (1978) as Paul
 Passe montagne (1978) as Serge
 Adieu voyages lents (1978) as Maurice
 Mais où et donc Ornicar (1979) as Michel
 Roberte (1979) as Von A.
 Écoute voir (1979) as Inspecteur Mercier
 The Police War (1979) as Capati
 Deux Lions au soleil (1980) as Paul
 The Dogs of War (1980) as Michel
 Psy (1981) as Jo
 Allons z'enfants (1981) as Sergent Billotet
 Neige (1981) as Willy
 Escape to Victory (1981) as Claude - The French
 Le Pont du Nord (1981) as Max
 Merry-Go-Round (1981) as Le décorateur
 Y a-t-il un Français dans la salle? (1982) as Paul Pauley
 Passion (1982) as Le machino
 Une chambre en ville (1982) as Dambiel
 Poussière d'empire (1983) as Sergeant Tam-Tam
 Flight to Berlin (1984) as Edouard
 Notre histoire (1984) as Chatelard
 Côté coeur, côté jardin (1984) as François
 Parole de flic (1985) as Sylvain Dubor
 Treasure Island (1985) as Israel Hands (The Rat)
 Tenue de soirée (1986) as Husband in house 3
 Salomè (1986) as Nerva's Aide-de-camp
 Je hais les acteurs (1986) as Chester Devlin
 Double messieurs (1986) as François
 La rebelión de los colgados (1986) as Don Severo
 Sale destin (1987) as Djebel Zanera
 Vent de panique (1987) as Le ferrailleur
 Ya bon les blancs (1988) as Peter
 36 Fillette (1988) as Le père
 Les Maris, les Femmes, les Amants (1989) as Martin
 La soule (1989) as Colonel Valbert
  as Louis Legendre
 Thick Skinned (1989) as Roland
 Mona et moi (1989) as Le père
  (1991, TV series) as Napoleon
 Cold Moon (1991) as Simon
 Sushi Sushi (1991) as Richard Souriceau
 Un paraguas para tres (1992) as Pierre Korzeniowski
 La Gamine (1992) as Charly
 Olivier, Olivier (1992) as l'inspecteur Druot
 Day of Atonement (1992) as Eric Lemonnier
 De force avec d'autres (1993) as L'alcoolique
 À cause d'elle (1993) as Jacques Hervy
 23h58 (1993) as Bernard
 The Patriots (1994) as Remy Prieur
 Parano (1994) as Le client (episode "Nuit d'essence")
 Dis-moi oui (1995) as Docteur Arnaud
 Fast (1995) as Francis
 Noir comme le souvenir (1995) as Commissaire Vasseur
 Les Frères Gravet (1996) as Pierre Gravet
 L'Éducatrice (1996) as Schaeffer
 Les Bidochon (1996) as Robert Bidochon
 Les Aveux de l'innocent (1996) as Inspecteur Reigent
 K (1997) as Commissaire Cortès
 Le Bossu (1997) as Cocardasse
 Comme elle respire (1998) as Marcel
 For Sale (1998) as Pierre Lindien
 Fait d'hiver (1999) as Commandant Ducroix
 Love me (2000) as Carbonne
 Total western (2000) as Jean-Mi
 Les Frères Sœur (2000) as Darius
 Brotherhood of the Wolf (2001) as Sardis
 De l'amour (2001) as Bertrand, the cop
 Fils de zup (2001) as Vanelli (policier)
 Mischka (2002) as Gégène
 La repentie (2002) as Man at posh party
 Two (2002) as Man in the car 
 The Man on the Train (2002) as Luigi
 Pas si grave (2003) as Manolete
 Camping à la ferme (2005) as Gaston
 Il a suffi que maman s'en aille... (2006) as Olivier
 Les Yeux bandés (2007) as Émile
 Capitaine Achab (2007) as Le père d'Achab
 Room of Death (2007) as Léon
 El camino (2008)
 Home (2008) (voice)
 Les Tremblements lointains (2008)
 Un monde à nous (2008) as Le collègue d'Éric
 Dirty money, l'infiltré (2008)
 Nuit de chien (2008) as Martins
 Like a Star Shining in the Night (2008) as Le père d'Anne
 The Limits of Control (2009) as The Frenchman
 Lignes de front (2009) as Marchand
 My Afternoons with Margueritte (2010) as Jojo
 Happy Few (2010) as Le père de Rachel
 Itinéraire bis (2011) as Paoli
 The Silence of Joan (2011) as Le moine
 Une folle envie (2011) as Malo Le Guellec
 Let My People Go! (2011) as Nathan
 Le Premier Homme (2011) as Le fermier
 De force (2011) as Greg Leduc
 Sister (2012) as Le chef-cuisinier
 Despre oameni si melci (2012) as Robert
 Comme un lion (2012) as L'agent français
 Amitiés sincères (2013) as Vincent Brassac
 Une histoire d'amour (2013) as Le psychanalyste
 Le Renard jaune (2013) as Inspecteur Giraud
 Bright Days Ahead (2013) as Roger
 Le Dernier Diamant (2014) as Albert
 The Forbidden Room (2015) as The Doctor
 Mad Love (2015) as Le curé de Mantaille
 Mirage d'amour avec fanfare (2016) as Alexandre
 Seances (2016)
 The Young One (2016) as Capitaine Firmin Paillet
 In Safe Hands (2018)
 Lost Illusions (2021)

References

External links

1944 births
2021 deaths
People from Lons-le-Saunier
French male film actors
French film directors
French male screenwriters
French screenwriters
French male non-fiction writers
20th-century French male actors
21st-century French male actors
French film editors